Larry Fong is an American cinematographer born in Los Angeles, California.

He has been the director of photography for four Zack Snyder films.

Early life and career
Fong showed interest and talent in art at a young age. His experience in photography and film was self-taught, beginning in junior high with short films shot on Super 8, cel animation, and stop motion projects. He graduated from UCLA with a B.A. in Linguistics and Art Center College of Design in Pasadena, specializing in film and photography.

He began his professional career filming music videos, and garnered enough attention to result in him filming two independent films and various TV pilots, commercials, and shorts.

In 2004, he was hired to film the Lost pilot, for which he was nominated for an ASC Award.

2006 saw the release of his first studio film, 300, directed by Zack Snyder.

In 2011, he was accepted into the American Society of Cinematographers, and in 2012 he was accepted into the Academy of Motion Picture Arts and Sciences.

Fong is also an accomplished magician and is a member of the Academy of Magical Arts.

Filmography
Film

Television

Awards
In 2005, he was nominated for an ASC Award for "Outstanding Achievement in Cinematography in Movies of the Week/Mini-Series/Pilot for Broadcast TV" for the pilot episode of Lost (2004).

References

External links

Variety – 10 Cinematographers to Watch: Larry Fong

20th-century births
Living people
American cinematographers
American people of Chinese descent
Year of birth missing (living people)
University of California, Los Angeles alumni
American magicians
Art Center College of Design alumni